I Am Not Afraid is the sixteenth studio album by South African trumpeter Hugh Masekela. It was recorded in Los Angeles and released in 1974. Tracks 2 and 7 were also included in the 2004 album Still Grazing.

Reception
A reviewer of Dusty Groove stated: "An excellent little record from Hugh Masekela – cut right during that perfect time when he was mixing soul, funk, and just the right amount of jazz to keep things real! The record features some nice electric piano from Joe Sample, and the best cuts have a choppy funky groove. Some cuts have vocals, but the best moments are instrumental."

Track listing

Personnel
Backing band – Hedzoleh Soundz
Cabasa (calabash), bells, drums (bass) – Acheampong Welbeck
Congas – James Kwaku Morton
Congas, flute, vocals – Nat "Leepuma" Hammond
Design, photography – Tom Wilkes
Talking drums, percussion, vocals – Isaac Asante
Drums (uncredited) – Stix Hooper
Electric bass, vocals – Stanley Kwesi Todd
Electric piano (uncredited) – Joe Sample
Engineer – Rik Pekkonen
Guitar – Richard Neesai "Jagger" Botchway
Mastered by – Arnie Acosta
Producer – Stewart Levine
Shekere, vocals – Samuel Nortey
Trumpet (uncredited), flugelhorn (uncredited), vocals (uncredited) – Hugh Masekela

References

External links

1974 albums
Hugh Masekela albums
Albums produced by Stewart Levine
Blue Thumb Records albums